The 2003 Major League Soccer season was the eighth season of play for Major League Soccer (MLS), the top flight of professional club soccer in the United States. The league had ten clubs who each played a 30-season regular season, followed by playoffs for the top four teams in each conference. The Chicago Fire won the Supporters' Shield and lost to the San Jose Earthquakes in the MLS Cup final.

Changes from 2002
Instead of a best-of-three series, the MLS Cup Playoffs changed their format so that the quarterfinal fixtures (or conference semifinals) would be a home and away aggregate over two matches, the team with the higher seed would have the home game in the second leg. The two semifinals (or conference finals) became one match fixtures instead of two legs. The Cup final remained one match.

Standings
Eastern Conference

Western Conference

The top four teams in each conference make the playoffs.								
s = Supporters Shieldx = Playoff Berth

Playoffs

Bracket

Eastern Conference Semifinals

Chicago Fire won 4–0 on aggregate.

New England Revolution won 3–1 on aggregate.

Western Conference Semifinals

San Jose Earthquakes won 5–4 on aggregate after golden goal extra time.

Kansas City Wizards won 3–1 on aggregate.

Conference Finals
Eastern Conference

Western Conference

MLS Cup

CONCACAF Champions' Cup

MLS berths to the 2004 CONCACAF Champions' CupMLS Cup ChampionsSan Jose EarthquakesMLS Cup runner-upChicago FireAwards and statistics
Team awardsMLS CupSan Jose EarthquakesU.S. Open CupChicago FireMLS Supporters' Shield'''Chicago Fire

Individual awards

Top goal scorers

Goal scoring totals

Team attendance totals

References

External links
MLS Site

 
Major League Soccer seasons
1